The 1923 World Fencing Championships were held in The Hague, Netherlands.

Medal summary

Men's events

References

1923 in Dutch sport
F
Sports competitions in The Hague
World Fencing Championships
20th century in The Hague